This article shows all participating team squads at the 2008 Women's Pan-American Volleyball Cup, held from May 30 to June 7, 2008 in Mexicali and Tijuana, Mexico.

Head coach: Horacio Bastit

Head coach: Luizomar De Moura

Head coach: Naoki Miyashita

Head coach: Braulio Godínez

Head coach: Luis Calderón

Head coach: Beato Miguel Cruz

Head coach: Luis León

Head coach: José dos Santos

Head coach: Juan Carlos Núñez

Head coach: Francisco Cruz Jiménez

Head coach: Thomas Hogan

Head coach: Tomás Fernández

References
NORCECA

S
P